Leigh Tucker Jones (August 16, 1888 – December 1, 1943) was the head coach for William & Mary College's men's basketball team for the 1928–29 season. In his sole season as coach he guided the Indians (now Tribe) to a 9–11 record.

Head coaching record

References

1888 births
1943 deaths
American men's basketball coaches
Basketball coaches from Virginia
College of William & Mary faculty
Deaths from pneumonia in the United States
Sportspeople from Norfolk, Virginia
Sportspeople from Richmond, Virginia
St. John's University (New York City) faculty
University of Virginia faculty
William & Mary Tribe men's basketball coaches